George Anson may refer to:

 George Anson, 1st Baron Anson (1697–1762), British admiral, noted for his circumnavigation of the globe
 George Anson (politician, born 1731) (1731–1789), British MP for Lichfield, nephew of the above
 Sir George Anson (British Army officer, born 1769) (1769–1849), British general and MP for Lichfield, son of the above
 George Anson (British Army officer, born 1797) (1797–1857), British general and MP for Great Yarmouth and Staffordshire South, nephew of the above
 George Edward Anson (1812–1849), British courtier and politician, first cousin of the above
 George Anson (priest) (1820–1898), Archdeacon of Manchester, first cousin of the above
 George W. Anson (1847–1920), British actor
 George Anson (doctor) (1850–1934), New Zealand cricketer and doctor

See also
 Earl of Lichfield
George Anson Starkweather (disambiguation)